The  was a limited express train service operated by East Japan Railway Company (JR East) in Japan between March 1996 and March 1997.

Engineering work to convert the Tazawako Line between Morioka and Ōmagari from  narrow gauge to  standard gauge for use by Akita Shinkansen services entailed the complete closure of the line between March 1996 and March 1997. The Tazawa limited express services that previously linked Morioka with Akita and Aomori were curtailed to run between Akita and Aomori only, and temporary Akita Relay limited express diesel services were operated instead between Kitakami on the Tōhoku Shinkansen and Akita via the Kitakami Line and Ōu Main Line.

Services commenced on 30 March 1996, with 10 "down" services and 11 "up" services operating daily using a specially built fleet of KiHa 110-300 series DMUs mostly in 4-car formations, but with some 3- or 7-car formations. These trains featured 2+2 abreast unidirectional limited express style seating identical to the seating used in E217 series EMU Green cars.

The Akita Relay services ended on 21 March 1997, the day before Akita Shinkansen Komachi services commenced between Morioka and Akita. The KiHa 110-300 series DMUs were subsequently refitted with standard seating, renumbered as KiHa 110-200 series, and reassigned for use on other lines such as the Iiyama Line.

Schedules

Down (Kitakami → Akita)

Up (Akita → Kitakami)

(Source:)

See also
 List of named passenger trains of Japan

References

Shinkansen
East Japan Railway Company
Named passenger trains of Japan
Kitakami Line
Ōu Main Line
Railway services introduced in 1996
Railway services discontinued in 1997
1996 establishments in Japan
1997 disestablishments in Japan

ja:こまち (列車)